Viktor Rydberg Gymnasium (VRG) is a group of four gymnasium (upper secondary schools) in Stockholm, Sweden named after the famous Swedish author Viktor Rydberg. The four upper secondary schools are VRG Djursholm, VRG Odenplan, VRG Jarlaplan and VRG Sundbyberg, run by the Viktor Rydberg Schools Foundation. The foundation also runs three secondary schools, Viktor Rydbergs samskola Djursholm, Viktor Rydbergs skola Vasastan, and Viktor Rydbergs skola Sundbyberg. Members of its board of directors are currently Louise Ankarcrona, Louise Westerberg, Fredrik Palmstierna, Stefan Persson, Fanny Falkenberg, Nils Andersson, Thomas Hvid and Sofia Bendz.

All four upper secondary schools are bilingual and about one fourth of the tuition is given in English by native speakers. This also means that course materials are both in Swedish and English. The schools have students attending from all over the greater Stockholm region, making admission highly competitive. VRG Odenplan has some of the highest minimum admission requirements in the country. Admission to its natural sciences program with natural sciences orientation is especially competitive; in 2009 all students had perfect grades, and since 2016 all students has had a score of at least 330.0 (with a national average of 228.7; out of maximum possible 340.0) translated from their grades from Swedish primary school, due to high application rates.

History
The first Viktor Rydberg gymnasium was established in 1994, soon after the 1992 "Free School Reform". The reform enabled private actors to run publicly funded schools, in a way similar to charter schools. Such a free school was started by the two parents Louise Westerberg and Louise Andersson in the halls of Djursholm samskola's eastern wing. After three years the number of applicants had risen so drastically that a new school was started at Odenplan in central Stockholm. In its first year, a large number of students and 580 teachers applied to the school. In 2003, a new school was started at Jarlaplan in order to provide an option for students who wanted to pursue artistic activities more fully.

VRG Djursholm
The school was established in 1994 and is located in Djursholm, Danderyd north of Stockholm. It has 534 students from 18 different municipalities, and the student body VRG Djursholms elevkår.

Study programs
Natural Science program with orientation in natural science, social science and special variants in arts and music
Economic program with orientation in business and special variants in arts and music
Social Science program with orientation in behavioral science. This is also an advanced placement program in English in cooperation with Stockholm University, with all tuition in English.

VRG Odenplan
The school was established in 1998 and is since 2015 located in the newly renovated southern pavilion of Norrtulls sjukhus, Vasastan in central Stockholm. It has 594 students from 30 different municipalities, and an active and award-winning student body Viktor Rydberg Odenplans elevkår.

Study programs
Natural Science program with orientation in natural science, social science and special variants in arts and music
Social Science program with orientation in behavioral science
Economics program with orientation in business

VRG Jarlaplan
The school was established in 2003 and is located at Jarlaplan, Östermalm in central Stockholm. It has 522 students from 32 different municipalities, and the student body VRG Jarlaplans elevkår.

Study programs
Social Science program with orientation in social science
Economic program with orientation in business
Arts program with orientation in arts, dance, music and drama

VRG Sundbyberg 
The school was established in 2019 and is located at Landsvägen, Sundbyberg a close suburb to Stockholm. It has 160 students in year one and will by the school year of 2021/2022 have around 600 students.

Study programs

Natural Science program with orientation in natural science or social science.
Economic program with orientation in business or law
Arts program with orientation in estetics and media, music - singer/songwriter or music production.

Projects
The schools have several projects, such as European Youth Parliament, Model European Parliament, Model United Nations and the yearly VRG-musical.

Notable alumni
Daniel Adams-Ray
Oskar Linnros

See also

Djursholms samskola
Education in Sweden
Enskilda Gymnasiet
Kungsholmens Gymnasium
Norra Real
Östra Real
Södra Latin

References

External links

Schools in Sweden
International schools in Sweden
Gymnasiums (school) in Sweden
Education in Stockholm
Schools in Stockholm
Educational institutions established in 1994
1994 establishments in Sweden